Marshall Bradley "Brad" Webb (born November 27, 1961) is a retired United States Air Force lieutenant general who last served as commander of the Air Education and Training Command. He previously served as Commander, United States Air Force Special Operations Command and, before that, as Commander, NATO Special Operations Forces HQ. Previous to that assignment, he served as the Assistant Commanding General of Joint Special Operations Command (JSOC) and was involved in the 2011 operation to kill Osama bin Laden. Webb was seated next to President Barack Obama in the White House Situation Room during the mission. He later served as Director of Plans, Programs, Requirements, and Assessments, United States Air Force Special Operations Command.

Military career
Raised in Austin, Texas, Webb is a command pilot with more than 3,700 flying hours (mostly in helicopters), including 117 combat hours in Afghanistan, Iraq and Bosnia. He commanded the 20th Special Operations Squadron, the 352nd Special Operations Group, the 1st Special Operations Wing and the Twenty-Third Air Force. His staff assignments include duty at the Joint Special Operations Command and in the Office of the Secretary of Defense (Policy).

In May 2019, Webb was nominated to be the next commander of the Air Education and Training Command.

Webb retired from the Air Force on June 30, 2022.

Education
1984 Bachelor of Science degree in biology, U.S. Air Force Academy, Colorado Springs, Colo.
1990 Squadron Officer School, Maxwell Air Force Base, Ala.
1994 Master of Science degree in international relations, Troy University, Ala.
1998 Air Command and Staff College, Maxwell AFB, Ala.
1998 Armed Forces Staff College, Norfolk, Va.
2003 Air War College, by correspondence
2004 Master of Science degree in national security strategy, National War College, Fort Lesley J. McNair, Washington, DC.
2006 Senior Leader Seminar, Brookings Institution/European Institute of Public Administration, Maastricht, Netherlands, and Brussels, Belgium
2007 Air Force Enterprise Leadership Seminar, Kenan-Flagler Business School, University of North Carolina at Chapel Hill
2008 Center for Creative Leadership, Greensboro, N.C.

Assignments

July 1984 – May 1985, student, undergraduate pilot training (helicopter), Fort Rucker, Ala.
May 1985 – July 1985, UH-1N upgrade training, Kirtland AFB, N.M.
August 1985 – November 1987, UH-1N pilot, Detachment 4, 40th Aerospace Rescue and Recovery Squadron, Hill AFB, Utah
November 1987– July 1994, MH-53H/J pilot, instructor pilot and flight examiner, 20th Special Operations Squadron, Hurlburt Field, Fla.
July 1994 – July 1997, MH-53J flight examiner, group flight safety officer and flight commander 352nd Special Operations Group, Royal Air Force Mildenhall, England
August 1997 – June 1998, student, Air Command and Staff College, Maxwell AFB, Ala.
July 1998 – September 1998, student, Armed Forces Staff College, Norfolk, Va.
September 1998 – September 2000, action officer, Strategic Plans and Policy (J5), Joint Special Operations Command, Fort Bragg, N.C.
September 2000 – June 2003, assistant operations officer, operations officer, and Commander, 20th Special Operations Squadron, Hurlburt Field, Fla.
August 2003 – June 2004, student, National War College, Fort Lesley J. McNair, Washington, D.C.
June 2004 – June 2005, Deputy Director, Northern Gulf, Office of the Under Secretary of Defense for Policy, Near Eastern and South Asian Affairs, the Pentagon, Washington, D.C.
June 2005 – June 2007, Commander, 352nd Special Operations Group and Joint Special Operations Air Component, Special Operations Command Europe, RAF Mildenhall, England
July 2007 – November 2008, Commander, 1st Special Operations Wing, Hurlburt Field, Fla. (January 2008 – February 2008, Commander, Joint Special Operations Air Component, Special Operations Command Central, Joint Base Balad, Iraq)
November 2008 – April 2009, special assistant to the Commander, Air Force Special Operations Command, Hurlburt Field, Fla.
April 2009 – June 2010, Commander, 23rd Air Force, and Director of Operations, Headquarters Air Force Special Operations Command, Hurlburt Field, Fla.
July 2010 – July 2012, Assistant Commanding General, Joint Special Operations Command, Fort Bragg, N.C.
July 2012 – July 2013, Director, Plans, Programs, Requirements, and Assessments, Air Force Special Operations Command, Hurlburt Field, Fla.
July 2013 – August 2014, Commander, Special Operations Command Europe, Stuttgart-Vaihingen, Germany
Aug 2014 – July 2016, Commander, NATO Special Operations Headquarters, Mons, Belgium
July 2016 – July 2019, Commander, U.S. Air Force Special Operations Command, Hurlburt Field, Fla.
July 2019 – May 2022, Commander, Air Education and Training Command, Joint Base San Antonio, Texas

Awards and decorations

Other achievements
 1996 Cheney Award for most valorous flight of the year in humanitarian regard.

Effective dates of promotions

References

External links

1961 births
Living people
National War College alumni
Place of birth missing (living people)
Recipients of the Air Force Distinguished Service Medal
Recipients of the Defense Superior Service Medal
Recipients of the Legion of Merit
Recipients of the Distinguished Flying Cross (United States)
Recipients of the Humanitarian Service Medal
Troy University alumni
United States Air Force Academy alumni
United States Air Force generals
United States Air Force personnel of the Iraq War
United States Air Force personnel of the War in Afghanistan (2001–2021)